Thelyschista is a monotypic genus of flowering plants from the orchid family, Orchidaceae. The sole species is Thelyschista ghillanyi, endemic to the Bahia region of Brazil.

See also 
 List of Orchidaceae genera

References

External links 

Monotypic Orchidoideae genera
Cranichideae genera
Spiranthinae
Orchids of Brazil